Big Bang Special Event is a series of fan meeting events by Big Bang, which began in 2016 with 8 shows in Japan and South Korea, held alongside their 10th anniversary tour 0.TO.10. All members attended the first leg of the tour, however T.O.P missed all shows of the second leg, due to his two-year mandatory military service in South Korea.

Events

2016 Event 
The band held fan meetings alongside their Japanese tour 0.TO.10, under the name BIGBANG SPECIAL EVENT -HAJIMARI NO SAYONARA, with seven events. The shows were an hour long, and included a talk session with the five members and a live performance, each scheduled to be held before every dome concert. In December 2016, a show was announced in South Korea, and was held on the same day of the last concert at Gocheok Sky Dome.

2017 Events 
On February 14, 2017, it was announced that BigBang will hold fan meetings in Japan from the end of May to early June. This was the first event without T.O.P after his enlistment in February 2017, and the second time BigBang held fan meetings inside dome arenas. The event was approximately two hours long, with four talk sessions, a game corner and live performances.

October 5, 2017, as a part of their Last Dance Tour, YGEX announced two fans meeting to be held on Tokyo Dome and Kyocera Dome.

Set list
This set list is representative of the shows in 2017.
 "Koe o Kikasete"
 "Strong Baby"
 "Candle"
 "Always"
 "Loser"
 "Bang Bang Bang"
 "If You"
 "Bad Boy"
 "Fxxk It"
 "Feeling"
 "Fantastic Baby"
 "We Like 2 Party"
 "Bae Bae"
 "Last Dance"

Dates

References

External links
 Big Bang Japanese Site
 YG Entertainment

2016 concert tours
2017 concert tours
BigBang (South Korean band) concert tours